Wack Wack Golf and Country Club is a golf course and country club resort complex located in Mandaluyong, Metro Manila, Philippines.

The complex features two 18-hole championship courses, landscaped terrains, gardens and villas.

History
Wack Wack was founded by William James Shaw in 1930 – because he was disgusted that Larry Montes, a caddie who had won the 1929 Philippine Open tournament (and later many subsequent tournaments) at the Manila Golf Club in Caloocan, of which Shaw was a member, had been asked to leave the tournament celebration, by virtue of an alleged rule against the presence of caddies inside the Manila Golf Club. During the American colonial period, exclusive clubs in the Philippines such as the Manila Golf Club, Baguio Golf Club, and the Manila Polo Club tend to be reserved only to Americans. Shaw was also ostracized due to his marriage to a Filipino. The discrimination towards Montes and himself, led to Shaw to establish the Wack Wack Golf and Country Club.

According to legend, "wack wack" was the sound made by crows who roamed areas of golf courses. The logo of Wack Wack features two black birds.

In 1939, the golf course was taken out of Mandaluyong to become part of the newly-established Quezon City. However, in 1941, it was returned to Mandaluyong.

References

Further reading
 Lou Gopal, Manila Nostalgia
 Gleeck, Lewis Edward Jr. (1912–2005), Bill Shaw: The Man and the Legend, San Juan, Metro Manila: William J. Shaw Foundation, 1998.
 Zafra, Jessica, The Life and Legacy of William J. Shaw, San Juan, Metro Manila: William J. Shaw Foundation, 2009.

External links

Golf clubs and courses in the Philippines
Sports venues in Metro Manila
Buildings and structures in Mandaluyong
1930 establishments in the Philippines